Tisamenus (Ancient Greek: Τισαμενός) is the name of several people in classical history and mythology:

 Mythology
Tisamenus (son of Orestes), mythological king of Argos, and son of Orestes and Hermione.
Tisamenus (King of Thebes), a king of Thebes, son of Thersander and Demonassa.

History
Tisamenus of Elis, son of Antiochus, an ancient Greek seer and grandfather of the seer Agias of Sparta
Tisamenus, a descendant apparently of the above, who took part in the conspiracy of Cinadon, and was put to death for it in 397 BC.

Namesake
Tisamenus (insect), a genus of stick insects in the family Heteropterygidae

Notes

References 

 Apollodorus, The Library with an English Translation by Sir James George Frazer, F.B.A., F.R.S. in 2 Volumes, Cambridge, MA, Harvard University Press; London, William Heinemann Ltd. 1921. ISBN 0-674-99135-4. Online version at the Perseus Digital Library. Greek text available from the same website.
 Pausanias, Description of Greece with an English Translation by W.H.S. Jones, Litt.D., and H.A. Ormerod, M.A., in 4 Volumes. Cambridge, MA, Harvard University Press; London, William Heinemann Ltd. 1918. . Online version at the Perseus Digital Library
 Pausanias, Graeciae Descriptio. 3 vols. Leipzig, Teubner. 1903.  Greek text available at the Perseus Digital Library.

Characters in Greek mythology